Leo Wright (December 14, 1933 in Wichita Falls, Texas – January 4, 1991 in Vienna) was an American jazz musician who played alto saxophone, flute and clarinet. He played with Charles Mingus, Booker Ervin, John Hardee, Kenny Burrell, Johnny Coles, Blue Mitchell and Dizzy Gillespie in the late 1950s, early 1960s and in the late 1970s. Relocating to Europe in 1963, Wright settled in Berlin and later Vienna. During this time he performed and recorded primarily in Europe, using European musicians or fellow American expatriates, such as Kenny Clarke and Art Farmer. He died of a heart attack in 1991 at the age of 57.

Discography

As leader/co-leader
 Blues Shout (Atlantic, 1960)
 Suddenly the Blues (Atlantic, 1961)
 Soul Talk (Vortex, 1963)
 Modern Jazz Studio Number 4 (Amiga, 1965 [1970])
 Flute + Alto – Sax (Amiga, 1965 [1967])
Alto Summit (MPS, 1968) with Lee Konitz, Pony Poindexter and Phil Woods
 It's All Wright (MPS, 1972)
 Evening Breeze (Roulette, 1977)
 New Horn in Town/Blues Shote (Fresh Sound, 2012)

As sideman
With Kenny Burrell
 Bluesin' Around (Columbia, 1962 [1983])
With Gloria Coleman
 Soul Sisters (Impulse!, 1963)
With Johnny Coles
 Little Johnny C (Blue Note, 1963)
With Tadd Dameron
 The Magic Touch (Riverside, 1962)
With Red Garland
I Left My Heart... (Muse, 1978 [1985])
With Dizzy Gillespie
 Copenhagen Concert (SteepleChase)
 Gillespiana (Verve, 1960)
 An Electrifying Evening with the Dizzy Gillespie Quintet (Verve, 1961)
 Carnegie Hall Concert (Verve, 1961)
 Dizzy on the French Riviera (Philips, 1962)
 A Musical Safari – Live at the Monterey Jazz Festival 1961 (Booman, 1974)
 New Wave (Philips, 1963)
With Gildo Mahones
 I'm Shooting High (Prestige, 1963)
 The Great Gildo (Prestige, 1964)
With Jack McDuff
 Screamin' (Prestige, 1962)
With Blue Mitchell
 Step Lightly (Blue Note, 1964)
With Oliver Nelson
 Berlin Dialogue for Orchestra (Flying Dutchman, 1970)
With Dave Pike
 Limbo Carnival (New Jazz, 1962)
With Lalo Schifrin
 Lalo = Brilliance (Roulette, 1962)
 Bossa Nova: New Brazilian Jazz (Audio Fidelity, 1962)
 Samba Para Dos with Bob Brookmeyer (Verve, 1963)
With Richard Williams
 New Horn in Town (Candid, 1960)
With Jimmy Witherspoon
 Baby, Baby, Baby (Prestige, 1963)
With Antônio Carlos Jobim
 The Composer of Desafinado Plays (Verve, 1963)

References

External links
Short biography
Another Short Biography
A Longer Biography

American jazz alto saxophonists
American male saxophonists
American jazz clarinetists
American jazz flautists
1933 births
1991 deaths
20th-century American saxophonists
20th-century American male musicians
American male jazz musicians
Orchestra U.S.A. members
20th-century flautists